Lykiardopulo was a Greek shipping company founded in Kefalonia, who now go by the name of Neda Maritime. The company have also used the name Drake Shipping Co. Ltd.

History
The Lykiardopoulos family had been involved in shipping since the middle of 18th Century. By Lloyds 1904, they were presented as N.G. Lykiardinopoulos with a yellow and black quartered flag with the black letters N and L. The 1912 issue presented the company as N.D. Lykiardinopulos with a white flag with red star. 

Nikolaos Lykiardopulo  opened an office in London in 1910.

After 1929, the company's name was Lykiardinopulo. In 1936, Lykiardopulo then established Drake Shipping Co. in London with the purchase of a second hand tramp steamer and bought others during and after the war. By 1954, it operated four ships named the Merchant Prince (1939, freight cargo ship), Merchant Duke (1943, freight cargo ship), Merchant Knight (1952, tanker), and Merchant Baron (1953, tanker). These were either transferred to Greek registry or sold. By the 1960s Drake Shipping Co had become defunct. 

The company still operates from UK and from Greece as Neda Maritime Agency Co. Ltd..

They had 26 ships in 2012.

References

Info from crwflags

Shipping companies of Greece
Cephalonia